Cadena's long-tongued bat (Hsunycteris cadenai) is a bat species from Colombia and Ecuador. It was originally described in the genus Lonchophylla, but was moved to Hsunycteris when the latter was erected in 2014.

References

Bats of South America
Hsunycteris
Mammals of Colombia
Mammals described in 2006
Mammals of Ecuador